Georg Puusepp (3 February 1869 – 26 October 1937 Narva) was an Estonian politician. He was a member of Estonian Constituent Assembly. On 23 April 1919, he resigned his position and he was replaced by Peeter Londo.

References

1869 births
1937 deaths
Members of the Estonian Constituent Assembly